Fightball is a real-time card game designed by James Ernest and Mike Selinker and published by Cheapass Games in 2002.  Fightball is the third real-time card game published by Cheapass Games, following the success of Falling and Brawl.

Gameplay

In Fightball, each player takes the role of a Coach of one of six futuristic basketball teams competing in the fictional sport of Fightball.  Each player will have his own deck of cards representing that team.

When the game begins, both participants simultaneously play cards that feature players, balls, shots, and special effects. The goal of the game is to create Complete Plays by forming stacks, each featuring a shooter (player) card, ball card, and shot card that together total at least ten points.

Interaction between players is introduced by allowing players to play blockers and other cards into their opponents' stacks to attempt to reduce the total to less than ten.

A round (or quarter) of gameplay ends when either coach plays a Buzz card (which is at the bottom of their deck), after which there is a scoring round to determine the number of Complete Plays for each Coach.

A game of Fightball consists of four quarters, and the winner is the Coach with the largest number of Complete Plays.

Distribution
The six Fightball decks are sold in pairs, Aztecs vs. The Dark, The Cruisers vs. Texas Wildcats, and
Cavaliers vs. Team Sport.  Each individual deck is compatible with and playable against all of the rest.

Reviews
Pyramid

References

External links
Official Fightball website

Card games introduced in 2002
Dedicated deck card games
Cheapass Games games
Mike Selinker games